Plopi, formerly known as I. G. Duca, is a district of Timișoara, Romania. Before becoming a district of Timișoara, it was an independent settlement. It was annexed to Timișoara together with Ghiroda Nouă in 1949.

History 
Before 1918, most of the land was owned by née Malva Klaritz, the widow of Count László Gyürky. She apportioned the land for a fee to those who wanted it, her name appearing in the land register of Ghiroda commune until the 2000s. Around 1930, the district was named I. G. Duca, after Romanian prime minister Ion G. Duca; later, at the suggestion of sculptor Romulus Ladea, who lived here around 1940, it was renamed Plopi.

References 

Districts of Timișoara